Guayaquil Bay is the 2.59 km wide bay indenting for 1.25 km the north coast of Greenwich Island in the South Shetland Islands, Antarctica and entered between Agüedo Point and Orión Point.  The bay is used by ships servicing the Ecuadorian Antarctic base Pedro Vicente Maldonado situated 560 m south-southwest of Orión Point.  The area was visited by 19th century sealers operating from nearby Clothier Harbour.

The feature is named after the city of Guayaquil, Ecuador from where the Second Ecuadorian Antarctic Expedition departed.

Location

Maps
 L.L. Ivanov et al. Antarctica: Livingston Island and Greenwich Island, South Shetland Islands. Scale 1:100000 topographic map. Sofia: Antarctic Place-names Commission of Bulgaria, 2005.
 L.L. Ivanov. Antarctica: Livingston Island and Greenwich, Robert, Snow and Smith Islands. Scale 1:120000 topographic map.  Troyan: Manfred Wörner Foundation, 2009.

References
 SCAR Composite Antarctic Gazetteer.

Bays of Greenwich Island